The Conrad-Ferdinand-Meyer-Preis is a literary award in memory of Conrad Ferdinand Meyer.

The prize is given annually to up to three recipients by the Conrad Ferdinand Meyer-Stiftung in Zurich.

Laureates

1938 Max Frisch
1939 Franz Fischer
1941 Walter Sautter
1942 Kurt Guggenheim
1942 Walter Corti
1954 Hans Boesch
1955 Franz Fassbind
1958 Erwin Jaeckle
1959 Karl Jakob Wegmann
1960 Raffael Ganz
1961 Erika Burkart
1964 Herbert Meier
1966 Hugo Loetscher
1967 Werner Weber
1968 Adolf Muschg, Franz Hohler
1970 Gerold Späth
1972 Paul Nizon, Jürg Acklin
1973 Hans Ulrich Lehmann
1974 Silvio Blatter
1975 Beat Brechbühl
1976 Rolf Hörler
1979 Alice Vollenweider
1980 Hermann Burger, Franz Böni, Werner Bodinek
1981 Jürg Altherr
1983 Jürg Amann
1984 Hansjörg Schertenleib
1985 Emil Zopfi
1986 André Grab
1987 Hanna Johansen, Martin Hamburger
1988 Iso Camartin
1989 Christoph Rütimann
1991 Rita Ernst, Dante Andrea Franzetti
1992 Thomas David Müller, Peter Sieber
1993 Hannes Brunner, Tim Krohn
1994 Hans Ulrich Bächtold, Rainer Henrich, Kurt Jakob Rüetschi, Thomas Stalder
1995 Daniel Schnyder
1996 Urs Frei, Konrad Klotz
1997 Perikles Monioudis, Beatrice Maritz
1998 Silvia Gertsch, Max Bachmann

Swiss literary awards
Awards established in 1938
1938 establishments in Switzerland